Ritabrata Banerjee (born 15 November 1978) is an Indian politician. He is currently serving as the State 
President of All India Trinamool Trade Union Congress West Bengal . He was elected a Rajya Sabha member from West Bengal in February 2014.

Early life 
Ritabrata Banerjee has attended school at South Point High School, Kolkata, and obtained BA degree from Asutosh College and MA degrees in English at Calcutta University. He is a full-time political activist and a former General Secretary of the Student Union in his college.

Political controversy 
He has been alleged along with other young comrades for harassment of Finance minister of West Bengal Mr. Amit Mitra in New Delhi. In the month of April, 2013 in a protest program organised by Student Federation of India before the Planning Commission, few young members of the student organisation harassed Mr. Mitra.

He was suspended from CPM party membership on 2 June 2017 for 3 months pending investigations to the allegations of moral turpitude & leaking party secrets to the press. On 10 October, 2017 a lady named Namrata Dutta filed a complaint against Banerjee in Balurghat Police Station for sexual exploitation by promising marriage. Ritabrata denied the accusation claiming the woman  was extorting money from him asked him for 50 Lakhs not to file and FIR and uploaded screenshots of a WhatsApp conversation in which she asked him for money. Subsequently, CID, West Bengal served a notice to him. Ritabrata was expelled by the CPM after an interview to ABP Ananda television channel in which he spoke against Mohammed Salim and  Ritabrata claimed that he was not against the party and only against Prakash Karat, Brinda Karat and Mohammed Salim.

References 

1979 births
Living people
Rajya Sabha members from West Bengal
Trinamool Congress politicians from West Bengal
Communist Party of India (Marxist) politicians from West Bengal